Diarra, Mali is a small town and commune in the Cercle of Nioro du Sahel in the Kayes Region of south-western Mali. In 1998, the commune had a population of 6794.

References

Communes of Kayes Region